Aiham Hanz Ousou (born 9 January 2000) is a Swedish professional footballer who plays as a defender for Slavia Prague and the Sweden national team.

Club career

Early career 
Starting off his career with local clubs in the Gothenburg suburb Angered, Ousou made his senior debut in Division 5A Göteborg in 2016 with Angered MBIK. In 2017, he played half a season with Västra Frölunda IF in Division 3 Sydvästra Götaland before joining BK Häcken's youth organization the same year.

BK Häcken 
After failing to get playing time with BK Häcken's senior team, he joined AFC Eskilstuna on loan for the 2020 Superettan season. He played 15 games in all competitions during that season. In 2021, he joined GAIS on loan and represented the club in both Superettan and Svenska Cupen during the spring season.

Slavia Prague 
On 21 July 2021, Ousou joined Slavia Prague in the Czech First League. On 3 October 2021, whilst playing in his first Prague derby, Ousou picked up a red card in a 1–0 loss against Sparta Prague; Sparta scored from the resulting free-kick after Ousou's sending off.

International career 
Ousou made three appearances for the Sweden U19 team in 2018. In 2021, he served as captain for the Sweden U21 team under Poya Asbaghi.

On 10 June 2022, Ousou was called up to the Sweden team for the first time, for a UEFA Nations League match against Norway, but did not end up playing the match. He made his Sweden debut on 19 November 2022, in a 2–0 friendly win against Algeria when he replaced Victor Lindelöf as centre back at halftime.

Personal life 
Ousou was born in Mölndal, Sweden and is of Syrian descent.

Career statistics

Club

International

References 

2000 births
Living people
Kurdish sportspeople
Swedish footballers
Syrian Kurdish people
Allsvenskan players
Association football defenders
AFC Eskilstuna players
GAIS players
BK Häcken players
SK Slavia Prague players
Sweden youth international footballers
Sweden under-21 international footballers
Västra Frölunda IF players
Swedish people of Syrian descent
Swedish people of Kurdish descent
People from Mölndal
Sportspeople from Västra Götaland County